The 59th Filmfare Awards South ceremony honouring the winners and nominees of the best of South Indian cinema in 2011 was held on 7 July 2012 at the Jawaharlal Nehru Stadium, Chennai, India. For this year more than 451 films from each of the four film industries were considered for nominations in various categories.

Awards and nominees

Main awards
Winners are listed first and highlighted in boldface.

Kannada cinema

Malayalam cinema

Tamil cinema

Telugu cinema

Technical Awards

Special awards

Multiple nominations and awards
The following films received multiple nominations.

Kannada

Nominations
 8 nominations: Hudugaru
 6 nominations: Paramathma
 5 nominations: Lifeu Ishtene, Sanju Weds Geetha, Krishnan Marriage Story, Saarathi
 4 nominations: Kempe Gowda, Olave Mandhara
 2 nominations: Bettada Jeeva, Puttakkana Highway
 1 nomination: Vishnuvardhana, Jarasandha

Awards
 4 awards: Sanju Weds Geetha
 2 awards: Olave Mandhara
 1 award: Lifeu Ishtene, Hudugaru, Kempe Gowda, Puttakkana Highway

Malayalam

Nominations
 9 nominations: Salt N' Pepper
 8 nominations: Pranayam
 6 nominations: Beautiful, Indian Rupee
 4 nominations: Traffic, Urumi
 2 nominations: Adaminte Makan Abu, Chappa Kurish
 1 nomination: Arabiyum Ottakavum P. Madhavan Nairum, City of God, Khaddama, Makaramanju, Mohabbath, Nayika, Rathinirvedam, Snehaveedu, Swapna Sanchari, The Train

Awards
 4 awards: Pranayam
 2 awards: Indian Rupee, Traffic
 1 award:  Adaminte Makan Abu, Khaddama

Tamil

Nominations
 9 nominations: Deiva Thirumagal
 7 nominations: 7aum Arivu
 6 nominations: Aadukalam, Ko
 5 nominations: Vaagai Sooda Vaa
 4 nominations: Mankatha
 3 nominations: Engaeyum Eppothum
 2 nominations: Engeyum Kadhal, Mayakkam Enna, Nootrenbadhu
 1 nomination : Kaavalan, Mappillai, Siruthai

Awards
 5 awards: Aadukalam(1)
 2 awards: Engaeyum Eppothum, Ko, Vaagai Sooda Vaa
 1 award : Deiva Thirumagal (1), 7aum Arivu (1)

Telugu

Nominations
 10 nominations: Dookudu
 9 nominations: Sri Rama Rajyam
 6 nominations: Mr. Perfect
 5 nominations: 100% Love, Ala Modalaindi, Rajanna
 4 nominations: Kandireega
 1 nomination: Jai Bolo Telangana, Anaganaga O Dheerudu, Gaganam, Golconda High School, Oosaravelli, Dhada

Awards
 6 awards: Dookudu
 3 awards: Sri Rama Rajyam
 1 award: Anaganaga O Dheerudu (1), Badrinath (1), Rajanna, Prema Kavali (1)

 Number in brackets after the film title indicates the number of special awards included, which have no nominees.

References

External links
 
 
 59th Filmfare Awards South Winners
 59th Filmfare Awards South Nominees

Filmfare Awards South
2012 Indian film awards